Quercus guyavifolia is a species of flowering plant in the family Fagaceae, native to south-central China. An evergreen tree reaching , its leaves are golden-brown on their undersides, making it one of the most attractive of the golden oaks.  It is placed in section Ilex.

References

guyavifolia
Trees of China
Endemic flora of China
Flora of South-Central China
Plants described in 1913